Sitting volleyball at the 2015 Parapan American Games was played from 8–14 August 2015 at the Toronto Pan Am Sports Centre.

Participating nations

Team rosters

Men

Women

Medal summary

Medal table 
Source: Toronto2015.org

Medal events

References

External links
 

Events at the 2015 Parapan American Games